The meditation known in Arabic as naẓar ila'l-murd , "contemplation of the beardless" is a Sufi practice of spiritual realization.

Peter Lamborn Wilson claims this as the use of "imaginal yoga" to transmute erotic desire into spiritual consciousness. It was practiced by Awhad al-Din Kermani.

Richard Francis Burton's translation of The Book of the Thousand Nights and a Night (commonly called The Arabian Nights in English) included collections of stories that were often sexual in content and were considered pornography at the time of publication. In particular, the Terminal Essay in volume 10 of The Arabian Nights contained a 14,000 word essay entitled "Pederasty" (Volume 10, section IV, D) in which Burton speculated and opined that male homosexuality was prevalent in an area of the southern latitudes named by him the "Sotadic zone". Rumors about Burton's own sexuality were already circulating and were further incited by this work.

Criticism
Conservative Islamic theologians condemned the custom of contemplating the beauty of boys. Nazar was denounced and deemed a heretic by Ibn Taymiyya (1263–1328). Despite opposition from the clerics, the practice has survived in Islamic countries until only in recent years, according to Stephen O. Murray and Will Roscoe in their work on Islamic homosexuality.

See also
 Bacha bazi
 Ghilman
 Köçek

Notes
 

Sufism